1931 Jinan Air Crash occurred on November 19, 1931, when a Stinson Detroiter mail plane carrying one passenger and two pilots crashed into a mountainous area in Jinan, Shandong Province, China. All three people on board, including the only passenger, Chinese poet Xu Zhimo, died in the crash.

The aircraft was operated by China Airways Federal in  the Republic of China and was contracted by Chunghwa Post. It departed from Ming Gugong Airport in Nanking, heading to Nanyuan Airport in Beiping (now Beijing). The passenger, Xu Zhimo, was intending to attend an architectural lecture given by the well-known architect Lin Huiyin in Beiping. Because of Xu's fame as a poet, the crash shocked the literary community in China.

Background

Xu Zhimo's schedule 

Xu Zhimo was going to attend an architectural lecture in Beiping, which was given by Lin Huiyin. It was widely believed that Xu was determined to attend the lecture because Lin was romantically related to Xu. He went to be a member of the claques for her. Although Xu was warned that the weather en route to Beiping was changeable, he insisted on flying there, since it is much faster by air and the weather had been fair before the aircraft took off.

The aircraft and pilots 

The aircraft was a Stinson Detroiter SM-1F operated by China Airways Federal in the Republic of China and was contracted by Chunghwa Post. It was originally General Zhang Xueliang's private airplane, and Xu took the lift free. The aircraft was also carrying 500 lbs of mail. It had a nickname of Jinan.

The captain of the flight was Wang Guanyi (Chinese: 王贯一), and the first officer was Liang Bitang (Chinese: 梁璧堂), both 36 years old. They were experienced pilots graduated from Nanyuan Aviation School.

Crash 
The Stinson Detroiter got airborne around 8:00 am local time. It cruised over the path of the Jing Pu Railway, which directed the flight to Beiping. The weather was fine during the first part of the flight. The plane landed at Xu Zhou Airport for refueling near 10:00 am, and took off again 10 minutes later. This time first officer Liang was at the controls, as Captain Wang handed the flight over and moved to the passenger's seat. It then flew into Jinan airspace.  The aircraft encountered severe fog and began flying off course. The pilot lost the railway in his sight, so he kept on heading for the nearest Wujiapu Airport, which would help him go back on course again. However, the plane started to descend. After the plane passed the waypoint Changqing District, the pilot headed to the northwest for the target airport. Seconds later, the aircraft hit the peak of what is now called West Mountain below the summit, about six kilometers from Dangjiazhuang Railway Station, and broke off its right wing. This put the plane into a rapidly descending spiral, despite the fuselage remaining relatively intact in mid-air. The Detroiter crashed into the valley below and disintegrated, resulting in a series of fire and explosions, killing two of the three on board instantly.

Crash site 

The exact location of where the Stinson Detroiter crashed was controversial. The Government of the Republic of China claimed that the aircraft crashed into Mount Beida, where they set a tomb to commemorate Xu. Popular descriptions of the crash site include West Mountain, East Mountain, North Mountain (later research showed that the three names were for the same mountain), Mount Kai, and Mount Baima.

In 2013, investigators deduced the final location of the wreckage according to the documents in the archive. With the help of a modern electronic rangefinder, they followed Jing Pu Railway from Dangjiazhuang Station six kilometers north to a village called Chaomidian, which is north of the crash site. Ranging 1 kilometer from the village, the investigator found the valley, which was identical to eyewitnesses' description.

The investigation established that the crash site of the Stinson Detroiter was at West Mountain, which is in the east of Changqing District in southwest Jinan and one kilometer from the railway, at an elevation of 150 meters.

Search and rescue 
The crash of the Detroiter was witnessed by a patrol police, who immediately rushed to the scene along with some local residents. Meanwhile, Xu's friend, Liang Sicheng, was told to pick Xu up at Nanyuan Airport at around 3:00 pm. At around 4:30 pm, Liang feared that the flight might have crashed and called local police. 

When the rescuers found the wreckage, they discovered the bodies of the passenger and captain, with debris engulfed in flames. Xu, though not seriously burnt, had suffered from fatal cerebral trauma as well as fractured legs and several cuts on his body. Another friend of Xu, Yu Gengyu (Chinese: 于赓虞), described his corpse afterward as:

Next to Xu, carbonic remains of captain Wang's body was also found, scarcely recognizable. Rescuers also discovered first officer Liang, who lay a meter from the two corpses. He had received burns all over his body, yet remained conscious. Liang was rushed to the hospital, but he died en route. The other two on board were considered to have died at the scene of the crash, probably killed instantly.

The three bodies were later carried back to Jinan, and Xu's was eventually buried at Mount Beida, which local government had mistaken as the crash site.

Investigation 
The first thing investigators identified was a piece of the aircraft's right wing few meters from the mountain peak. That was the first part that came off. This chilled them, as in the same year, a Fokker F-10 had crashed in Kansas in the United States due to a structural failure of the aircraft's wing. Investigators suspected that this crash might be a similar case. But after scrutinizing the debris carefully, the theory was ruled out.

Because at that time there were no black boxes, the investigators could only search for clues either at the crash scene or by recreating the crash according to the eyewitnesses' accounts. Witnesses reported that the plane was flying dangerously lower than usual and was circling in the air seconds from the crash, which indicated to investigators that the pilots might have had difficulty finding their route.

Investigators also noted that there were two pilots commanding the Detroiter, whose cockpit is designed only for one pilot. They inferred that the first officer was in control at the time of the accident due to the positions of the bodies at the crash scene.

Based on the evidence, they hypothesized that the pilot descended the aircraft beneath the minimum safety altitude while attempting to seek their target, Wujiapu airport. Visibility was bad when the plane flew into the fog, and the crews could only use compass heading to navigate. After the plane flew via Dangjiazhuang Railway Station, the first officer gradually lost sight of the railway due to poor visibility. The first officer could look for the airport lights only visually, and failed to recognize the terrain. Runway lights were blocked by the mountains surrounding Jinan. But instead, the pilot in control considered that it was simply caused by thick fog and misjudged the situation. Thus, he continued descending until the plane flew too close to the mountain. There were no ground proximity warning systems on aircraft at that time, so when the terrain abruptly appeared in front of the windshields, it was too late for the pilot to divert the plane.

The investigators also concluded that lack of conversation between both pilots also played a major factor of the crash. They believe that the accident could have been avoided if the captain, sitting in the passenger's seat, had reminded the pilot at control that the flight was dangerously close to the terrain.

Another theory suggested that both the pilots were disoriented and failed to notice the plane was descending slowly. Therefore, the pilot could not know his exact altitude, which led to the crash.

The investigation of the Jinan air crash also revealed deficiencies in early aviation regulations. The crew should have canceled the plan due to the possibility of severe meteorologic conditions.

Conspiracy theories 
Some believed that the air crash was a murder arranged by Xu Zhimo's romantic rivals, and that the most likely suspect was Wang Geng (Chinese: 王赓), who was the former husband of Lu Xiaoman (Xu's wife).

A popular version of the crash pointed out that just at the night before the crash, the Northeast Army of Republic of China, in which Wang Geng had served, received a secret telegram which instructed the special agents to destroy a mail plane leaving from Nanking for Beiping. The mission was accomplished. It was a coincidence that the Detroiter planned to share the same route with the plane of their target, meaning that the plane was either shot down or blew up by spies. Investigators authenticated the theory through documents of Northeast Army, but confirmed it was untrue. There were no any records of this special "instruction".

Legacy 

The literary community in China went into mourning when they heard of the Xu's death. Overwhelmed by sadness, Lin Huiyin collected a piece of wreckage from the crash scene. She preserved it at her bedside in memory of Xu throughout the rest of her life.

Xu's memorial park was built in 1932, a year after the crash.

Similar accidents 
TWA Flight 3, a Douglas DC-3, crashed into a cliff moments after takeoff, killing all people on board, including the Hollywood star Carole Lombard. The crash was attributed to a navigation error by the captain, which took the plane off course moments after its departure.
Superga air disaster. A Fiat G.212 of Avio Linee Italiane (Italian Airlines), carrying the entire Torino football team crashed into the retaining wall at the back of the Basilica of Superga, leaving no survivors. The crash was another CFIT due to low visibility.
Air New Zealand Flight 901, a scheduled Douglas DC-10 sightseeing flight, flew into Mount Erebus in Antarctica, killing all 237 passengers and 20 crew on board. The air crash was a typical CFIT.
1996 Croatia USAF CT-43 crash. A United States Air Force Boeing CT-43A crashed on approach to Dubrovnik, Croatia, while on an official trade mission. The crash was ascribed to the poorly designed instrument approaching systems in Dubrovnik Airport as well as pilot error.

References 

Aviation accidents and incidents in China
1931 in China
Airliner accidents and incidents involving controlled flight into terrain
Airliner accidents and incidents caused by pilot error